Tourlida is an island in Missolonghi Lagoon, in Greece. It is a long-narrow earthy land about 5 km south of Missolonghi. Tourlida is the largest lagoon island of Missolonghi lagoon and the only inhabited. Its population is 15 inhabitants according to 2011 census. A landmark of Tourlida is the houses on piles. They are stilt houses that are built by fishermen. These houses are named Pelades (Πελάδες) in Greek.

History
Tourlida is named after the bird Eurasian curlew that is named tourlida in Greek and it is common in lagoon. The island was joined with the opposite land with a road that was constructed in 1885 thanks to domestic politician Charilaos Trikoupis. The road created an interior lagoon inside Missolonghi Lagoon, known as Kleisova Lagoon. The most common activity in the island is the fishing as well as the gathering of salt from the nearby salt pit.

Historical population

References

External links
Tourlida in gtp.gr

Islands of Greece
Missolonghi
Populated places in Aetolia-Acarnania